Kristine Roug (born 12 March 1975) is a Danish sailor and Olympic champion.

She won a gold medal in the Europe Class at the 1996 Summer Olympics in Atlanta.
 
Kristine sailed the Europe dinghy between 1990 and 2000. In summer 1994 she won the world championship in the
Europe dinghy two weeks later she won ISAF single dinghies for women in
the Laser, and half-year later in January 1995 in New Zealand she won
once again the World Championship. At that time the Danish media really
got interested in her talent and compared her with the five times
Olympic Champion Mr. Povl Elstrøm.

With the Olympic gold medal in 1996, Kristine Roug made several Danish outstanding records:
• The first Danish woman to get gold in sailing
• The first Danish woman to win Olympic gold within the last 48 years. 
• The youngest Dane to win Olympic gold ever.

World championships

1994 - LA ROCHELLE - FRANCE

1. Kristine Roug - DEN • 2. Tine Moberg Parker – CAN • 3. Margriet Matthijsse - NED

1995 - NORTH SHORE CITY - NEW ZEALAND 

1. Kristine Roug DEN • 2. Margriet Matthijsse - NED • 3. Natalia Via Dufresne - ESP

1997 - SAN FRANCISCO – USA

1. Margriet Matthijsse - NED • 2. Kristine Roug – DEN • 3. Melanie Dennisson - AUS

1998 - TRAVEMÜNDE - GERMANY

1. Carolijn Brouwer – NED • 2. Shirley Robertson – GBR • 3. Kristine Roug – DEN

2000 - SALVADOR DA BAHÍA – BRAZIL

1. Kristine Roug – DEN • 2. Shirley Robertson – GBR • 3. Meg Gaillard - USA

			
Kieler Woche

1997 • 1999 • 2000

Danish Sailer of the year: 
1996 • 1994

References

External links

sports-reference.com
telecards.colnect.com

1975 births
Living people
Danish female sailors (sport)
Sailors at the 1996 Summer Olympics – Europe
Sailors at the 2000 Summer Olympics – Europe
Olympic sailors of Denmark
Olympic gold medalists for Denmark
Olympic medalists in sailing

Medalists at the 1996 Summer Olympics
Europe class world champions
World champions in sailing for Denmark